The 2001 Nebraska Cornhuskers football team represented the University of Nebraska–Lincoln in the 2001 NCAA Division I-A football season. The team was coached by Frank Solich and played their home games in Memorial Stadium in Lincoln, Nebraska.

Schedule

Roster and coaching staff

Depth chart

Game summaries

TCU

Troy State

Notre Dame

Rice

Rice at Nebraska, on September 20, 2001 was the first NCAA College Football game following the infamous Terrorist Attacks of September 11, 2001.

Missouri

Iowa State

Baylor

Texas Tech

Oklahoma

Kansas

Kansas State

Colorado

Miami (FL)

Rankings

After the season
Nebraska finished in a tie for 1st place in the Big 12 North Division and also tied for 1st conference-wide, with a final record of 11–2 (7–1).

The events which took place at the end of the season put a strain on the system of college rankings and polls.  The Cornhuskers lost their final regular season game to Colorado 36–62, leaving both tied for 1st place in the Big 12 North Division.  As Colorado won the head-to-head contest, Colorado then participated in the Big 12 Championship and defeated Texas 39–37.  Despite Colorado's accomplishments, Nebraska's strength-of-schedule component in the Bowl Championship Series selection system resulted in the Cornhuskers being selected to play in the 2002 Rose Bowl for the BCS National Championship Game against Miami, despite the fact that Nebraska had not played in its own conference championship game and technically had not even won its own division.

Nebraska then fell to Miami 14–37 in the Rose Bowl, but the controversy of these events led to more modifications to the BCS formula, which followed a pattern of seasonal tweaks dating back nearly to when the BCS system was implemented.

Senior Cornhusker quarterback Eric Crouch was the 2001 recipient of the Walter Camp Award, the Davey O'Brien Award, and the Heisman Trophy.  Coach Solich was also selected Big 12 Football Coach of the Year.

Awards

NFL and pro players
The following Nebraska players who participated in the 2001 season later moved on to the next level and joined a professional or semi-pro team as draftees or free agents.

References

Nebraska
Nebraska Cornhuskers football seasons
Nebraska Cornhuskers football